Beaufortia kweichowensis is a species of gastromyzontid loach native to rivers in China.  The common names for this popular aquarium species are Chinese hillstream loach, Hong Kong pleco, butterfly hillstream loach, and Chinese sucker fish.

Habitat
Beaufortia kweichowensis can be found in fast-flowing highland and in-land streams in China.

In the aquarium

Aquarium maintenance
An aquarium that duplicates the natural habitat of the Chinese hillstream loach is ideal since these fish require high oxygen levels.  They need excellent water-flow, adequate aeration and numerous hiding places inside the tank.  Adequate lighting is necessary to promote algal growth in the aquarium.  Other live plants, however, are not necessary although they may assist in maintaining water quality.  Suitable plants for high-flow tank environments are Anubias species and Microsorum pteropus, which can be grown on rocks or driftwood.

Chinese hillstream loaches normally thrive in an aquatic environment with medium water hardness (12 dh maximum), with water temperatures from 68 °F to 75 °F (20 to 23.8 °C), and with pH readings ranging from 7.0 to 8.0.  A tank size of 36" (90 cm) minimum is preferable.  They can be kept in groups of three to seven.

Chinese hillstream loaches can reach up to 3 inches (7.5 centimeters) in length.

Compatibility
B. kweichowensis is characteristically not too aggressive an aquarium fish, but like the Bornean Gastromyzon species, it is territorial and may engage in skirmishes or "topping", where one fish will try to cover another fish. These clashes seldom result in damage, because one fish will eventually cease from engaging in the topping behavior.

Feeding
Chinese hillstream loaches have small mouths thus necessitating the offering of good quality fish food such as flakes, sinking pellets, algae wafers, thawed frozen bloodworms, mysid shrimps, blanched spinach, kale and natural algae.

Breeding
There are minimal differences between males and females in Beaufortia kweichowensis but the males often display stronger coloration.  Although B. kweichowensis are not normally bred in captivity, they may reproduce in pits under rocks inside tanks that mimic riverine settings.

References

Footnotes

Bibliography
https://web.archive.org/web/20070926235810/http://www.practicalfishkeeping.co.uk/pfk/pages/species.php?tsn=639788
http://www.answers.com/topic/hillstream-loach

http://www.ubio.org/browser/details.php?namebankID=2822735

Beaufortia (fish)
Fish of Asia
Taxa named by Fang Ping-Wen
Fish described in 1931
Gastromyzontidae